The Central Intelligence Agency Act, is a United States federal law enacted in 1949.

The Act, also called the "CIA Act of 1949" or "Public Law 110" permitted the Central Intelligence Agency to use confidential fiscal and administrative procedures and exempting it from many of the usual limitations on the use of federal funds. The act (Section 7) also exempted the CIA from having to disclose its "organization, functions, officials, titles, salaries, or numbers of personnel employed." It also created a program called "PL-110" to handle defectors and other "essential aliens" outside normal immigration procedures, as well as give those persons cover stories and economic support. It was passed by the United States Congress on May 27.

Constitutional challenge 

The Act's Constitutionality was challenged in 1972 in the Supreme Court case United States v. Richardson, on the basis that the Act conflicted with the penultimate clause of Article I, Section 9 of the United States Constitution, which states that "No Money shall be drawn from the Treasury, but in Consequence of Appropriations made by Law; and a regular Statement and Account of Receipts and Expenditures of all public Money shall be published from time to time."  The Supreme Court found that Richardson, as a taxpayer, lacked sufficient undifferentiated injury to enjoy standing to argue the case.

References

External links
fas.org/sgp/jud/tenetvdoe-petresp.pdf
fas.org/irp/cia/ciahist.htm

1949 in law
United States federal defense and national security legislation
Central Intelligence Agency